The 1960 Nova Scotia general election was held on 7 June 1960 to elect members of the 47th House of Assembly of the Province of Nova Scotia, Canada. It was won by the Progressive Conservatives.

Results

Results by party

Retiring incumbents
Liberal
Geoffrey W. Stevens, Halifax County Dartmouth

Progressive Conservative
Malcolm Stewart Leonard, Digby
John Michael Macdonald, Cape Breton North
Hiram Thomas, Kings West

Nominated candidates
Legend
bold denotes party leader
† denotes an incumbent who is not running for re-election or was defeated in nomination contest

Valley

|-
|bgcolor=whitesmoke|Annapolis East
||
|Hanson Dowell2,66648.69%
|
|Henry Hicks2,65848.55%
|
|Murray Alton Bent1512.76%
|
|
||
|Henry Hicks
|-
|bgcolor=whitesmoke|Annapolis West
|
|Charles T. LeBrun2,06842.74%
||
|Peter M. Nicholson2,57153.14%
|
|Louis A. Beeler1994.11%
|
|
||
|Peter M. Nicholson
|-
|bgcolor=whitesmoke|Clare
|
|Kenneth Weaver2,03447.87%
||
|Pierre E. Belliveau2,21552.13%
|
|
|
|
||
|Pierre E. Belliveau
|-
|bgcolor=whitesmoke|Digby
|
|E. Keith Potter2,59348.15%
||
|Victor Cardoza2,65149.23%
|
|Foster Journeay1412.62%
|
|
||
|Malcolm Stewart Leonard†
|-
|bgcolor=whitesmoke|Hants West
||
|George Henry Wilson3,62349.27%
|
|Gerald Regan3,41246.40%
|
|Howard B. Wile3194.34%
|
|
||
|George Henry Wilson
|-
|bgcolor=whitesmoke|Kings North
||
|Gladys Porter3,06051.19%
|
|Eric Balcom2,78246.54%
|
|Levitte Joseph Melanson1362.28%
|
|
||
|Eric Balcom
|-
|bgcolor=whitesmoke|Kings South
||
|Edward Haliburton2,38857.29%
|
|Bruce Trenholm1,58137.93%
|
|George R. Goucher1994.77%
|
|
||
|Edward Haliburton
|-
|bgcolor=whitesmoke|Kings West
|
|R.F. Hazel3,42545.18%
||
|Edward D. MacArthur3,93751.93%
|
|George Turner2192.89%
|
|
||
|Hiram Thomas†
|}

South Shore

|-
|bgcolor=whitesmoke|Lunenburg Centre
||
|George O. Lohnes4,38452.25%
|
|Nathan Simeon Joudrey3,83245.67%
|
|Arthur William Benedict1752.09%
|
|
||
|George O. Lohnes
|-
|bgcolor=whitesmoke|Lunenburg East
||
|Maurice L. Zinck2,14058.37%
|
|Kirk S. Hennigar1,40538.33%
|
|Albro Boehner1213.30%
|
|
||
|Maurice L. Zinck
|-
|bgcolor=whitesmoke|Lunenburg West
||
|Harley J. Spence2,85852.94%
|
|Frederick E.L. Fowke2,54147.06%
|
|
|
|
||
|Harley J. Spence
|-
|bgcolor=whitesmoke|Queens
||
|W. S. Kennedy Jones3,77059.04%
|
|Della P. Richardson2,61640.96%
|
|
|
|
||
|W. S. Kennedy Jones
|-
|bgcolor=whitesmoke|Shelburne
||
|James McKay Harding3,53952.94%
|
|William Russell MacKay3,14647.06%
|
|
|
|
||
|James McKay Harding
|-
|rowspan=2 bgcolor=whitesmoke|Yarmouth 
||
|George A. Burridge4,81124.82%
|
|Eric Spinney4,30922.23%
|
|
|
|Willard Franklyn Allen6503.35%
||
|Eric Spinney
|-
|
|George A. Snow4,57823.62%
||
|Willard O'Brien5,03725.98%
|
|
|
|
||
|Willard O'Brien
|}

Fundy-Northeast

|-
|rowspan=2 bgcolor=whitesmoke|Colchester
||
|Robert Stanfield8,57428.82%
|
|Hugh Charles MacKinnon5,43918.28%
|
|Harvey T. Curtis7042.37%
|
|
||
|Robert Stanfield
|-
||
|George Isaac Smith8,21927.62%
|
|Gordon Purdy6,12720.59%
|
|Helen K. Wright6922.33%
|
|
||
|George Isaac Smith
|-
|bgcolor=whitesmoke|Cumberland Centre
||
|Stephen T. Pyke2,30852.91%
|
|Ralph F. Gilroy1,75340.19%
|
|John R. Tabor3016.90%
|
|
||
|Stephen T. Pyke
|-
|bgcolor=whitesmoke|Cumberland East
||
|James A. Langille5,08157.08%
|
|Walter T. Purdy3,47139.00%
|
|Lloyd L. Ayer3493.92%
|
|
||
|James A. Langille
|-
|bgcolor=whitesmoke|Cumberland West
|
|George Percy Graham2,21945.79%
||
|Allison T. Smith2,41849.90%
|
|Thomas Alton Johnstone2094.31%
|
|
||
|Allison T. Smith
|-
|bgcolor=whitesmoke|Hants East
||
|Ernest M. Ettinger2,42649.50%
|
|Carl Spencer Grant2,20745.03%
|
|Alfred James Scothorn2685.47%
|
|
||
|Ernest M. Ettinger
|}

Halifax/Dartmouth/Eastern Shore

|-
|bgcolor=whitesmoke|Halifax Centre
||
|Donald MacKeen Smith4,92148.01%
|
|Gordon S. Cowan4,65145.38%
|
|James M. Murray6786.61%
|
|
||
|Gordon S. Cowan
|-
|bgcolor=whitesmoke|Halifax County-Dartmouth
|
|Murray Ritcey7,65343.05%
||
|Gordon L. S. Hart8,25846.46%
|
|Percy W. Dares1,86410.49%
|
|
||
|Geoffrey W. Stevens†
|-
|bgcolor=whitesmoke|Halifax East
|
|Nelson Gaetz2,43244.06%
||
|Duncan MacMillan2,78750.49%
|
|Wallace H. Mason3015.45%
|
|
||
|Duncan MacMillan
|-
|bgcolor=whitesmoke|Halifax North
|
|Robert Mullane7,44444.09%
||
|John E. Ahern7,97447.23%
|
|Charles A. Moulton1,4668.68%
|
|
||
|John E. Ahern
|-
|bgcolor=whitesmoke|Halifax Northwest
||
|Gordon H. Fitzgerald4,20946.55%
|
|Ronald Manning Fielding4,18246.26%
|
|L.C. Wilson6507.19%
|
|
||
|Ronald Manning Fielding
|-
|bgcolor=whitesmoke|Halifax South
||
|Richard Donahoe5,86154.65%
|
|Robert James Butler4,30240.12%
|
|Ralph Loomer5615.23%
|
|
||
|Richard Donahoe
|-
|bgcolor=whitesmoke|Halifax West
|
|D. C. McNeil6,68445.06%
||
|Charles H. Reardon6,92546.68%
|
|Harold J. Martell1,2258.26%
|
|
||
|Charles H. Reardon
|}

Central Nova

|-
|bgcolor=whitesmoke|Antigonish 
||
|William F. MacKinnon3,17754.77%
|
|Vincent J. MacDonald2,49543.01%
|
|Alex MacPherson1292.22%
|
|
||
|William F. MacKinnon
|-
|bgcolor=whitesmoke|Guysborough
||
|Alexander MacIsaac3,12349.98%
|
|Norman Robert Anderson2,93446.95%
|
|Leslie Wilfred Myers1923.07%
|
|
||
|Vacant
|-
|bgcolor=whitesmoke|Pictou Centre
||
|Donald R. MacLeod4,75543.92%
|
|James H. Power3,61533.39%
|
|Doris Nicholson2,45622.69%
|
|
||
|Donald R. MacLeod
|-
|bgcolor=whitesmoke|Pictou East
|
|William A. MacLeod2,42444.55%
||
|John W. MacDonald2,56847.20%
|
|Barrie M. Hould4498.25%
|
|
||
|William A. MacLeod
|-
|bgcolor=whitesmoke|Pictou West
||
|Harvey Veniot2,74452.28%
|
|W.A. Broidy2,35344.83%
|
|W.E. Salsman1522.90%
|
|
||
|Harvey Veniot
|}

Cape Breton

|-
|bgcolor=whitesmoke|Cape Breton Centre
|
|Lowell Murray1,96427.19%
|
|James P. McNeil1,88726.13%
||
|Michael James MacDonald3,37146.68%
|
|
||
|Michael James MacDonald
|-
|bgcolor=whitesmoke|Cape Breton East
||
|Layton Fergusson4,86245.56%
|
|Joe A. Wadden1,56714.68%
|
|John L. MacKinnon4,24339.76%
|
|
||
|Layton Fergusson
|-
|bgcolor=whitesmoke|Cape Breton North
||
|Tom MacKeough5,25746.83%
|
|Ted Sullivan3,09427.56%
|
|Thomas R. MacDonald2,87525.61%
|
|
||
|John Michael Macdonald†
|-
|bgcolor=whitesmoke|Cape Breton Nova
||
|Percy Gaum2,52536.93%
|
|Wilfred Gillis2,09430.63%
|
|Albert Ollie Wilson2,21832.44%
|
|
||
|Percy Gaum
|-
|bgcolor=whitesmoke|Cape Breton South
||
|Donald C. MacNeil5,15346.23%
|
|Ritchie MacCoy3,71833.36%
|
|Bernard O'Neil2,27520.41%
|
|
||
|Donald C. MacNeil
|-
|bgcolor=whitesmoke|Cape Breton West
||
|Edward Manson4,19245.37%
|
|Herbert Shannon3,65239.53%
|
|John R. Lynk1,39515.10%
|
|
||
|Edward Manson
|-
|rowspan=2 bgcolor=whitesmoke|Inverness
|
|Archie Neil Chisholm3,92324.43%
||
|Joseph Clyde Nunn4,11325.62%
|
|Stephen James MacLellan3532.20%
|
|
||
|Joseph Clyde Nunn
|-
|
|Ralph Mauger MacKichan3,64822.72%
||
|Roderick MacLean4,01825.03%
|
|
|
|
||
|Roderick MacLean
|-
|bgcolor=whitesmoke|Richmond
|
|Byron Seymour Langley2,49148.89%
||
|Earl Wallace Urquhart2,60451.11%
|
|
|
|
||
|Earl Wallace Urquhart
|-
|bgcolor=whitesmoke|Victoria
|
|Leonard Walter Jones1,81746.96%
||
|Carleton L. MacMillan2,05253.04%
|
|
|
|
||
|Carleton L. MacMillan
|}

References

Further reading
 

1960
1960 elections in Canada
1960 in Nova Scotia
June 1960 events in Canada